From March 6 to May 18, 1928, voters of the Democratic Party elected delegates to the 1928 Democratic National Convention, for the purpose of choosing the party's nominee for president in the 1928 election.

In sharp contrast to the three previous open nominations, the delegate selections were all-but-conclusive in favor of New York governor Al Smith, who entered the convention only a few votes short of the required two-thirds majority; he won on the first ballot after several delegates shifted to him. Smith was the first Catholic nominated by a major party for President of the United States and the first non-incumbent Democrat to win his party's nomination on the first ballot since 1908. 

Despite his easy nomination, his failure to carry most Southern states was a sign of things to come; Smith lost the general election to Herbert Hoover in a landslide, with many Southern voters defecting to the Republican Party over their opposition to Smith's Catholic faith.

Candidates

Nominee

Withdrew during convention

Favorite sons
The following candidates ran only in their home state's primary or caucus for the purpose of controlling its delegate slate at the convention and did not appear to be considered national candidates by the media.

Governor A. Victor Donahey of Ohio
U.S. Senator Pat Harrison of Mississippi
Former U.S. Senator Gilbert Hitchcock of Nebraska
Businessman Jesse H. Jones of Texas
Former U.S. Senator Atlee Pomerene of Ohio
Banker Evans Woollen of Indiana
Chief Justice Richard C. Watts of South Carolina

Primaries

See also
 Republican Party presidential primaries, 1928
White primary

References